The Heiltsuk are a First Nations people of British Columbia.

Heiltsuk may also refer to:

Heiltsuk-Oowekyala language, a Wakashan language spoken in British Columbia
Heiltsuk dialect, a dialect of Heiltsuk-Oowekyala spoken by the Heiltsuk people
Heiltsuk Nation, the tribal government representing the Heiltsuk